Varpaisjärvi is a former municipality of Finland. It was consolidated with the municipality of Lapinlahti on January 1, 2011.

The municipality was located in the Northern Savonia region in the province of Eastern Finland.

The municipality was unilingually Finnish.

References

External links

Municipality of Varpaisjärvi – Official website

Lapinlahti
Former municipalities of Finland
Populated places established in 1911
Populated places disestablished in 2011